University of the Year may refer to:

Australia 
 Australian University of the Year, a discontinued annual award given by the Australian Good Universities Guide

Ireland and United Kingdom 
 Times Higher Education University of the Year, an annual award given by Times Higher Education

United Kingdom 
 Sunday Times University of the Year, an annual award given by the The Times and The Sunday Times